Chbaniyeh (also spelled Shbaniyeh or Ishbaniyya) is a municipality in the Baabda District of Mount Lebanon Governorate, Lebanon. It has a religiously-mixed population Maronites, Melkites and Druze.

References

Bibliography

Populated places in Baabda District
Druze communities in Lebanon
Eastern Orthodox Christian communities in Lebanon
Maronite Christian communities in Lebanon